Laubscher is a surname. Notable people with the surname include:

H.P. Laubscher (born 1916), South African army officer
Japie Laubscher (1919–1981), South African musician
Julien Laubscher (born 1987), South African pop artist
Rick Laubscher (born 1949), American businessman and journalist